The British 110 metres hurdles athletics champions (men) and 100 metres hurdles athletics champions (women) covers four competitions; the current British Athletics Championships which was founded in 2007, the preceding LAC Championships (1866-1879), the AAA Championships (1880-2006) and finally the UK Athletics Championships which existed from 1977 until 1997 and ran concurrently with the AAA Championships.

Where an international athlete won the AAA Championships the highest ranking UK athlete is considered the National Champion in this list.

Past winners

The most successful athlete in the event was Colin Jackson who won 18 national titles across 11 years in the AAA Championship/UK Athletics Championship era, winning both titles in seven of those years. The most 'undisputed' titles won is 9 by Don Finlay in the AAA era. 

 NBA = No British athlete in medal placings
 nc = not contested
 + UK Championships
 ^ 75 metres hurdles
 ^^ 100 yards hurdles
 ^^^ 100 metres hurdles

References

100/110 metres hurdles
British
British Athletics Championships